Ilgizar Ilgizovich Safiullin (born 9 December 1992) is a Russian athlete who specialises in the 3000 metres steeplechase. He represented his country at the 2013 and 2015 World Championships without qualifying for the final. In addition he won the gold medal at the 2013 Summer Universiade.

He is an ethnic Tatar.

Competition record

Personal bests
Outdoor
3000 metres – 8:32.53 (Tampere 2009)
3000 metres steeplechase – 8:18.49 (Paris 2015)
Indoor
1500 metres – 3:45.26 (Moscow 2012)
3000 metres – 7:54.90 (Moscow 2013)

References

External links

1992 births
Living people
People from Artyom, Russia
Sportspeople from Primorsky Krai
Russian male middle-distance runners
Russian male steeplechase runners
Universiade gold medalists in athletics (track and field)
Universiade gold medalists for Russia
Medalists at the 2013 Summer Universiade
World Athletics Championships athletes for Russia
Russian Athletics Championships winners
Tatar sportspeople
Far Eastern Federal University alumni